François Henricus Anthonie van Dixhoorn (born 17 June 1948) is a Dutch poet.

Career 
Van Dixhoorn made his debut with the poetry collection Jaagpad / Rust in de tent / Zwaluwen vooruit in 1994. He won the C. Buddingh'-prijs for this debut.

He was nominated for the Ida Gerhardt Poëzieprijs in 2008 for his work Twee piepjes (2007). For his work De zon in de pan (2012) he was nominated for the VSB Poëzieprijs.

Awards 
 1994: C. Buddingh'-prijs, Jaagpad / Rust in de tent / Zwaluwen vooruit

Publications 
 Jaagpad / Rust in de tent / Zwaluwen vooruit (1994)
 Armzwaai / Grote keg / Loodswezen I (1997)
 Takken molenwater / Kastanje jo / Hakke tonen / Uiterton / Molen in de zon (2000)
 Dan op de zeevaartschool (2003)
 Twee piepjes (2007)
 De zon in de pan (2012)
 Verre uittrap (2017)

References

External links 

 F. van Dixhoorn, Poetry International Web
 F. van Dixhoorn (in Dutch), Digital Library for Dutch Literature

1948 births
Living people
Dutch male poets
People from Reimerswaal
C. Buddingh' Prize winners